Vacation is a 2015 American road comedy film written and directed by Jonathan Goldstein and John Francis Daley (in their directorial debuts). It stars Ed Helms, Christina Applegate, Leslie Mann, Beverly D'Angelo, Chris Hemsworth, and Chevy Chase. It is the fifth and final theatrical installment of the Vacation film series, serving as a standalone sequel to Vegas Vacation (1997). It is also the second not to carry the National Lampoon name after Vegas Vacation, and was released by New Line Cinema and Warner Bros. on July 29, 2015. It grossed $104 million on a $31 million budget and received generally negative reviews.

Plot
Rusty Griswold is now working as a pilot for a low budget regional airline called Econo-Air, living in Suburban Chicago, Illinois and shares a stale relationship with his wife Debbie and their two sons, their shy and awkward 14-year-old James, and their sadistic 12-year-old Kevin, who constantly bullies and torments his older brother. The gloating from his friends Jack and Nancy Peterson about a family trip they had in Paris, Île-de-France in France doesn't help his situation.

He desires to relive the fun of his family vacations and holiday gatherings from his childhood. These memories prompt him to abandon his family's annual trip to their cabin in Cheboygan, Michigan (which the rest of the family secretly hated), and instead drive cross country from Chicago to Walley World, just like he did with his parents and sister. For the trip, Rusty rents a Tartan Prancer, an ugly, over-complicated Albanian SUV.

Along the way, the Griswolds take many detours. The first stop is in Memphis, Tennessee, where it's revealed that the otherwise mild-mannered Debbie was an extremely promiscuous Tri Pi sorority sister in college nicknamed 'Debbie Do Anything'. To prove that she was the rebellious student, Debbie attempts to run an obstacle course while drunk, but fails miserably. While staying at a motel, James meets Adena, a girl his age that he saw while driving on the highway, but she is scared away by Rusty's failed attempts to be a "wingman".

In Arkansas, they are led to a supposedly hidden hot spring by a "helpful" local, eventually realizing that it's actually a raw sewage dump. They return to their SUV, only to see that it's been broken into and sprayed with graffiti, as well as finding their luggage and cash stolen.

They stop in Plano, Texas, to get help from Rusty's sister Audrey and her attractive husband Stone Crandall. Rusty begins to suspect problems in his relationship with Debbie due to her seeming acceptance of Stone's obviously outward sexual advances, but she rebuffs his suspicions; Stone then walks in on the couple and makes a show of his muscular body and oversized genitalia.

Spending the following night at a Wigwam Motel in Holbrook, Arizona, Rusty and Debbie sneak away and attempt to have sex at the Four Corners Monument, where officers from all four states of Utah, Colorado, Arizona and New Mexico confront the couple. When the officers start arguing about who gets to make the arrest, Rusty and Debbie are able to escape. James encounters Adena again, and finally asserts himself against Kevin thanks to encouragement from Adena.

The next morning, they nearly get killed by Chad, a Grand Canyon rafting guide, who had just been dumped by his fiancé. Later, their SUV runs out of gas in the middle of the desert, and Rusty's unfamiliarity of the key fob causes the vehicle to explode, leading him to walk off dispirited and alone, thinking about the disastrous trip. Unfortunately, they have been tracked down by a seemingly unstable truck driver, who they think has been stalking them throughout the trip. In actuality, the trucker has been instead trying to return Debbie's missing wedding ring. He ends up giving them a lift to San Francisco, California.

There, they spend the night at a bed and breakfast run by Rusty's parents, Clark and Ellen. They intend to fly home the next day, but Rusty and Debbie confront each other about their stale marriage and decide to start over again. With some encouragement from Clark the next morning, Rusty borrows his father's Wagon Queen Family Truckster and drives Debbie and the boys to Walley World to ride their newest roller coaster, the Velociraptor.

After spending the entire day waiting in line, they are cut off by Ethan, a rival pilot who Rusty knows in Chicago, and his family before the announcement of the park's closing. A fight breaks out, which the Griswolds win, forcing the other family to flee. The Griswolds finally board the ride, but it stalls halfway up the butterfly inversion, and they are rescued after several hours.

Rusty uses his airline connections to book a vacation in Paris with just Debbie and himself after sending the boys home where their neighbors will look after them. On the plane to Paris, they are seated in jump seats next to a lavatory. Exasperated, Debbie learns that it will be a 12-hour flight.

Cast

 Ed Helms as Russell "Rusty" Griswold, a pilot for Econo-Air living in Suburban Chicago
 Anthony Michael Hall, Jason Lively, Johnny Galecki, and Ethan Embry appear in archival photos from the previous Vacation films.
 Christina Applegate as Debbie Fletcher Griswold, Rusty's wife.
 Emily Kincaid as young Debbie Fletcher
 Skyler Gisondo as James Griswold, Rusty and Debbie's older son.
 Cameron McIntyre as young James Griswold
 Steele Stebbins as Kevin Griswold, Rusty and Debbie's younger son.
 Chris Hemsworth as Stone Crandall, an up-and-coming anchorman and Audrey's husband.
 Leslie Mann as Audrey Griswold-Crandall, Rusty's sister.
 Dana Barron, Dana Hill, Juliette Lewis, and Marisol Nichols appear in archival photos from the previous Vacation films.
 Chevy Chase as Clark Griswold, Rusty and Audrey's father who now owns a bed and breakfast in San Francisco.
 Beverly D'Angelo as Ellen Griswold, Rusty and Audrey's mother who now owns a bed and breakfast in San Francisco.
 Charlie Day as Chad, a suicidal river rafting guide who was recently dumped by his girlfriend.
 Catherine Missal as Adena, James' love interest.
 Ron Livingston as Ethan, an airline pilot and Rusty's rival.
 Norman Reedus as Trucker, an unnamed truck driver who stalks the Griswold family.
 Keegan-Michael Key as Jack Peterson, a friend of the Griswold family.
 Regina Hall as Nancy Peterson, the wife of Jack and friend of the Griswold family.
 Elizabeth Gillies as Heather, a member of the Tri Pi sorority that is a fan of Debbie.
 Tim Heidecker as Utah Cop
 Nick Kroll as Colorado Cop
 Kaitlin Olson as Arizona Cop
 Michael Peña as New Mexico Cop
 Hannah Davis Jeter as The Girl in the Red Ferrari, a different girl driving a Red Ferrari who tries to flirt with Rusty only to get struck by a semi-trailer truck.
 David Clennon as Co-Pilot
 Colin Hanks as Jake
 Ryan Cartwright as Terry
 John Francis Daley as Robert

Production

Development
In February 2010, it was announced by New Line Cinema (owned by Warner Bros., which released the previous films) that a new Vacation film was being produced. Executive Producer was Steven Mnuchin. Produced by David Dobkin and written and directed by John Francis Daley and Jonathan Goldstein, the story focuses on Rusty Griswold as he takes his own family to Walley World.

Casting
In July 2012, it was announced that Ed Helms would star in the sequel as Rusty Griswold, who now has his own family misadventures on the road. On March 28, 2013, Variety announced that original series stars Beverly D'Angelo and Chevy Chase were in talks to reprise their roles, most likely in the form of a torch-passing cameo role. No mention was made of other series regulars, such as Randy Quaid's Cousin Eddie.

On April 23, 2013, it was reported that the film had been delayed indefinitely, due to creative differences. Later, Chris Hemsworth and Charlie Day were also reported to co-star. Skyler Gisondo and Steele Stebbins played Rusty Griswold's sons along with Helms and Christina Applegate. On September 15, Leslie Mann joined the film to play Rusty's sister, Audrey Griswold. On September 29, Keegan-Michael Key and Regina Hall were cast to play family friends of the Griswolds.

On October 10, director Daley revealed in an interview that he might have a cameo with Samm Levine and Martin Starr, which would be a reunion of cult comedy show Freaks and Geeks, though it was not confirmed. On November 12, four actors joined to play Four Corners cops, Tim Heidecker, Nick Kroll, Kaitlin Olson, and Michael Peña.

Filming
Principal photography began on September 16, 2014, in Atlanta, Georgia. On September 16, scenes were filmed on location at the Olympic Flame Restaurant.

On September 30 and October 1, 2014, scenes were filmed on location at The Twelve Oaks Bed and Breakfast in historic Covington, Georgia. The Twelve Oaks was staged as Christina Applegate's character's sorority house, Triple Pi, and the location of her attempt to run the obstacle course once more to prove that she is the Chug Run champion.

Other scenes were shot around Piedmont and 6th avenues from October 6 to 8, including at the Shellmont Inn. On October 22, 2014, scenes were filmed at the U.S. National Whitewater Center in Charlotte, North Carolina. Scenes for Walley World were filmed at Six Flags Over Georgia.

In a similar vein to the original film's "Wagon Queen Family Truckster", the film features a custom-designed minivan named the "Tartan Prancer". Dubbed the "Honda of Albania", it is a heavily modified Toyota Previa and features unconventional styling elements such as a mirror-image front and rear clip, complete with two sets of headlights (pulled from the Land Rover LR3/Discovery) and rearview mirrors, as well as dashboard buttons marked by nonsensical symbols. As part of a promotional tie-in with the film, Edmunds.com released a tongue-in-cheek review comparing the Tartan Prancer against the 2015 Honda Odyssey.

Music
The musical score for the film was composed by Mark Mothersbaugh. A soundtrack album was released by WaterTower Music on July 24, 2015. In addition to Mothersbaugh's score, it features many contemporary songs, along with several renditions of Lindsey Buckingham's "Holiday Road" (including a remixed and remastered version of the original that plays at the start of the film, and again near the end).

Release
The film was originally set to be released on October 9, 2015, but it was moved to July 31, 2015, before finally being pushed up to July 29, 2015, the 32nd anniversary of the release of the first Vacation film. Warner Bros. spent a total of $35.2 million on advertisement for the film.

Home media 
The film was released on DVD and Blu-ray on November 3, 2015 by Warner Home Video.

Reception

Box office
Vacation grossed $58.9 million in North America and $45.8 million in other territories for a worldwide total of $104.7 million, against a budget of $31 million.

The film grossed $1.2 million from its early Tuesday preview showings, and a combined $6.3 million on Wednesday and Thursday. In its opening weekend, it grossed $14.7 million, finishing second at the box office behind Mission: Impossible – Rogue Nation ($55.5 million).

Critical response
On review aggregator website Rotten Tomatoes, the film holds an approval rating of 28% based on 176 reviews and an average rating of 4.30/10. The site's consensus reads, "Borrowing a basic storyline from the film that inspired it but forgetting the charm, wit, and heart, Vacation is yet another nostalgia-driven retread that misses the mark." On Metacritic, it has a score of 34 out of 100 based on 33 critics, indicating "generally unfavorable reviews". On CinemaScore, audiences gave the film an average grade of "B" on an A+ to F scale.

Neil Genzlinger of The New York Times gave the film a positive review and praised the Kevin Griswold character, saying, "The kid with the potty mouth may cost Warner Bros. some business at the box office, but in a strange way he elevates Vacation, a very funny R-rated movie with a PG-13 heart." Chris Nashawaty of Entertainment Weekly gave it a "B−" rating and wrote, "The new Vacation is both better than I'd feared and not as hilarious as I'd hoped. It's intermittently funny and instantly forgettable." Richard Roeper of the Chicago Sun-Times wrote, "It's a vile, odious disaster populated with unlikable, dopey characters bumbling through mean-spirited set pieces that rely heavily on slapstick fight scenes, scatological sight gags and serial vomiting." Rolling Stone reviewer Peter Travers gave it 1.5 out of 4 stars, saying: "Leslie Mann and wild-card Chris Hemsworth, as her cock-flashing hubby, get the heartiest hoots. The rest is comic history warmed over."

Accolades

References

External links
 
 
 
 

2015 comedy films
2015 directorial debut films
2015 films
2010s adventure comedy films
2010s comedy road movies
American adventure comedy films
American comedy road movies
American sequel films
Dune Entertainment films
2010s English-language films
Films about families
Films about vacationing
Films scored by Mark Mothersbaugh
Films set in Michigan
Films set in New Mexico
Films shot in Atlanta
Films shot in Louisiana
Films shot in North Carolina
National Lampoon's Vacation (film series)
New Line Cinema films
Warner Bros. films
Films directed by Jonathan Goldstein and John Francis Daley
2010s American films